The Gabbiano-class corvettes were a group of 59 vessels built for the Regia Marina of Italy for service during the Second World War. They were built to a war-time design and intended for anti-submarine and escort duties.

Design

The Gabbianos were designed to be built quickly and in large numbers and began to enter service in May 1942. The ships were fitted with sonar and hydrophones, but the Regia Marina did not consider removing features such as torpedo tubes to reduce topweight or allow the vessels to carry more anti-submarine weapons.

Service

Sixty vessels were ordered, and 29 were completed by September 1943. The Germans seized many of these vessels after the Italian surrender in 1943, and operated them under new names until the end of the war. The Germans also completed 20 vessels under construction. Fourteen vessels survived the war; the postwar Marina Militare used them as patrol vessels until 1972.

Two corvettes played important parts in Italian history: Persefone brought Mussolini, under arrest after 25 July 1943, from Gaeta to Ponza, while a short time later on 9 September 1943 Baionetta carried the Italian royal family and the Italian government with Marshall Badoglio from Pescara to Brindisi during their escape from Rome after the armistice.

Ships

Notes

References

External links
 
Gabbiano Marina Militare website

Corvette classes
Ships built in Italy
World War II naval ships of Italy